Casnovia is a village in the U.S. state of Michigan. It is situated on the boundary between Muskegon and Kent counties and lies partially within both. The population was 319 at the 2010 census. The village is located partially within Tyrone Township.

History
Casnovia was founded in 1850 by Lot Fulkerson and gained a post office in 1851. It was platted in 1862 and incorporated as a village in 1875.  The name is derived from the Latin words case for home and nova for new.

Geography

Demographics

2010 census
As of the census of 2010, there were 319 people, 121 households, and 94 families living in the village. The racial makeup of the village was 88.4% White, 0.3% African American, 1.9% Native American, 4.4% from other races, and 5.0% from two or more races. Hispanic or Latino of any race were 11.6% of the population.

There were 121 households, of which 28.1% had children under the age of 18 living with them, 65.3% were married couples living together, 7.4% had a female householder with no husband present, 5.0% had a male householder with no wife present, and 22.3% were non-families. 15.7% of all households were made up of individuals, and 3.3% had someone living alone who was 65 years of age or older. The average household size was 2.64 and the average family size was 2.97.

The median age in the village was 41.9 years. 22.3% of residents were under the age of 18; 8.6% were between the ages of 18 and 24; 23.8% were from 25 to 44; 32.3% were from 45 to 64; and 12.9% were 65 years of age or older. The gender makeup of the village was 50.8% male and 49.2% female.

2000 census
As of the census of 2000, there were 315 people, 122 households, and 91 families living in the village. The racial makeup of the village was 98.73% White, 0.32% Native American, and 0.95% from two or more races. Hispanic or Latino of any race were 0.32% of the population.

There were 122 households, out of which 33.6% had children under the age of 18 living with them, 60.7% were married couples living together, 8.2% had a female householder with no husband present, and 25.4% were non-families. 19.7% of all households were made up of individuals, and 8.2% had someone living alone who was 65 years of age or older. The average household size was 2.58 and the average family size was 2.98.

In the village, the population was spread out, with 25.4% under the age of 18, 8.6% from 18 to 24, 33.3% from 25 to 44, 21.9% from 45 to 64, and 10.8% who were 65 years of age or older. The median age was 35 years. For every 100 females, there were 107.2 males. For every 100 females age 18 and over, there were 99.2 males.

The median income for a household in the village was $42,019, and the median income for a family was $47,188. Males had a median income of $36,563 versus $26,250 for females. The per capita income for the village was $18,962. About 1.2% of families and 4.7% of the population were below the poverty line, including 5.8% of those under age 18 and 5.1% of those age 65 or over.

Notable people
Bion J. Arnold, electrical engineer, was born here.
Floyd R. Newman (1890–1990), oil man

References

Notes

Sources

 

Villages in Muskegon County, Michigan
Villages in Kent County, Michigan
Villages in Michigan
Populated places established in 1850
Grand Rapids metropolitan area
1850 establishments in Michigan